Shenley Brook End is a village, district and wider civil parish in Milton Keynes, Buckinghamshire, England.  Together with its neighbouring districts of Shenley Church End, Shenley Wood and Shenley Lodge, the districts are collectively known as "The Shenleys".

Today, the historic village is the core of the new district that bears its name.  The district is bounded by V2 Tattenhoe Street, V3 Fulmer Street, H6 Childs Way and H7 Chaffron Way.

The mathematician and logician Alan Turing was billeted here during his time at Bletchley Park.

History
The village name 'Shenley' is an Old English language word meaning 'bright clearing'. In the Domesday Book of 1086 the area was collectively known as Senelai.

The distinction between the Brook End and the Church End happened in the 12th century when a new manor house was constructed in Shenley Brook End by the Mansell family. However, by 1426 the two manors were owned by the same person and the distinction between the two places was in name only.

Education
It has primary school, Long Meadow, and a secondary school, Shenley Brook End School, in 2007 one of the best performing schools in Milton Keynes.

Civil parish
The parish includes Shenley Lodge, Furzton, Shenley Brook End, Emerson Valley, Westcroft, Tattenhoe (including Kingsmead, Howe Park Wood and Snelshall East) and Tattenhoe Park (including Snelshall West).  The parish is bounded to the north-east by V4 Watling Street, to the north-west by H6 Childs Way, to the south-west by the City boundary with the rest of Buckinghamshire (at Whaddon) and to the south-east by H8/A421 Standing Way.

Emerson Valley
Emerson Valley is primarily a housing district but is noted for being the home of Milton Keynes Rugby Football Club.  It is also the name of an electoral ward for Milton Keynes City Council.

Furzton

Furzton is primarily a housing district with a small office development but half the district is taken up by Furzton Lake (a balancing lake) and the flood plain of Loughton Brook.

Shenley Lodge
Shenley Lodge is a residential district, noted for the Energy World development of exemplar high-energy-efficiency houses in 1986.

Snelshall and Kingsmead
These two grid squares are in the far south-west of Milton Keynes, abutting the boundary with Whaddon parish. They are primarily residential, with an industrial area south of the brook. The notable feature of the district is the site of the ruined Snelshall Priory, a ruined Benedictine priory founded in about 1200.

Tattenhoe and Tattenhoe Park

These districts share the Tattenhoe grid square and are primarily residential.

Westcroft

A large fraction of Westcroft is taken by the District Centre of the same name. It is a large retail development that serves the west side of Milton Keynes. The rest of the district is residential.

Shenley Brook
The brook rises near the site of Snelshall Priory, flows through Furzton where it is joined by a tributary from Emerson Valley, then goes on to become the "tear-drop lakes" in Loughton and flows into the river Great Ouse at New Bradwell.

References

External links

Civil parishes in Buckinghamshire
Areas of Milton Keynes
Villages in Buckinghamshire